Keynote Systems was a U.S. based company that specialized in developing and marketing software as a service technology to measure, test, and improve from the end user perspective, the performance of websites, online content, applications, and services across browsers, networks, and mobile devices. Keynote provided independent testing, measurement and monitoring of mobile content, applications, and services on real devices across multiple mobile operator networks.

Keynote Systems merged with Dynatrace in June 2015.

Overview
Headquartered in San Mateo, California, and employing about 300 people, the company went public on NASDAQ on September 24, 1999.

The company claimed corporate customers including American Express, BP, Caterpillar, Disney, eBay, E*TRADE, Expedia, Microsoft, Sony Ericsson, Sprint, T-Mobile, Verizon and Vodafone.

History

Keynote Systems was founded in 1995. It launched ‘Keynote Perspective’ in 1996 and launched Business 40 Internet Performance Index in 1997 and globalized internet-performance metrics securing $4.7 million in equity financing.

Keynote released the first ever internet multi-page transactional measurement service in 1999
and launched Streaming Perspective product in 2000.

In 2001, Keynote added Google to Business 40 Internet Performance index.

In 2002, Keynote won InternetWeek's ‘Best of Breed’ award and was named the 13th fastest growing North American tech company.

In 2003, the company offered to buy back 7.5 million of its shares, or about 33 percent, for $71.3 million.

In 2004, Keynote introduced Performance Authority which were email alerts to warn public of internet threats.
In 2005 Keynote and Zandan announce product-development and marketing partnership.

In 2007, Keynote joined Russell 3000 index. Keynote's Voice Perspective Service was also named one of the top 25 innovations of 2007 by VoIP News and launched Web Site Performance index for the 2008 Olympics. Keynote also introduced KITE (Keynote Internet Testing Environment) and launched MITE (Mobile Internet Testing Environment), a desktop based mobile testing. Keynote Systems won Gold Mobile Star Award for mobile application testing.

In 2009, Keynote Systems introduced Mobile Application Perspective 3.0, a real time operational monitoring for text messaging. Keynote MITE won Jolt Product Excellence Award.

In August, 2013, private equity firm, Thoma Bravo, acquired Keynote Systems for about $395 million.

In June 2015, Keynote Systems merged with Dynatrace, the latter having John Van Siclen as acting CEO.

Acquisitions
The company acquired 17 companies:
 May 10, 2000:  Velogic
 August 18, 2000: RedAlert
 July 17, 2001: Envive
 October 23, 2001: OnDevice
 May 14, 2002: NetMechanics, adds content testing to companies portfolio
 July 22, 2002: Streamcheck
 October 28, 2002: Enviz
 2003, Xaffire's Insight Service Suite
 December 3, 2003: MetrixNet
 April 6, 2004: NetRaker
 July 7, 2004: Hudson-Williams NY
 September 10, 2004: Vividence
 February 3, 2005: Hudson-Williams Europe
 December 6, 2005: GomezPro Business Unit
 April 3, 2006: Keynote Sigos
 April 21, 2008: Zandan 
 October, 2011: DeviceAnywhere

References

External links
 Keynote Systems

Online companies of the United States
Companies based in San Mateo, California
Software companies based in the San Francisco Bay Area
Software companies established in 1995
Companies formerly listed on the Nasdaq
1999 initial public offerings
2013 mergers and acquisitions
2015 mergers and acquisitions
Cloud computing providers
Defunct software companies of the United States